Peter John Rattray (14 September 1958 – 22 February 2021) was a New Zealand cricketer. He played in 22 first-class and 20 List A matches for Canterbury from 1980 to 1985.

His sister Sue Rattray represented New Zealand in international cricket.

See also
 List of Canterbury representative cricketers

References

External links
 

1958 births
2021 deaths
New Zealand cricketers
Canterbury cricketers
Cricketers from Christchurch